The City of Newtown was a local government area about  west of the regional city of Geelong, Victoria, Australia.

History

Newtown and Chilwell was first incorporated as a borough on 9 March 1858, and became a town on 16 April 1924. It was proclaimed a city on 7 October 1949. It was renamed the City of Newtown on 22 November 1967.

On 18 May 1993, the City of Newtown was abolished, and along with the Cities of Geelong and Geelong West, the Rural City of Bellarine, the Shire of Corio, and parts of the City of South Barwon and the Shires of Barrabool and Bannockburn, was merged into the newly created City of Greater Geelong.

Wards

The City of Newtown was divided into three wards, each of which elected three councillors:
 North Ward
 South Ward
 West Ward

Geography

The City of Newtown consisted of the suburb of Newtown, on the north bank of the Barwon River, and extended across the river to include Queens Park. It was bounded by Aberdeen, Minerva and Autumn Streets to the north, the Barwon River to the south, and La Trobe Terrace to the east.

The Town Hall was located on Pakington Street, opposite Virginia Street and adjacent to Armytage House.

Population

* Estimates in 1958, 1983 and 1988 Victorian Year Books.

References

External links
 Victorian Places - Newtown and Chilwell

Newtown City
City of Greater Geelong
1993 disestablishments in Australia
1858 establishments in Australia